Thomas Brassey (7 November 1805 – 8 December 1870) was an English civil engineering contractor and manufacturer of building materials who was responsible for building a large portion of the world's railways in the 19th century.  For some of these constructions he was the sole contractor but he usually worked in partnership with other contractors, particularly Peto and Betts.

Railways and associated structures
By 1847 he had built one third of the railways in the United Kingdom and by the time of his death he had built one in twenty of the miles of railway in the world. He also built structures associated with railways - bridges, stations, etc. - and non-railway related structures. The following is an incomplete list of his projects. For the British railways the dates given are the date of the relevant Act of Parliament; for railways elsewhere and for other structures the date given is the date of the contract.

Railway lines

United Kingdom

1830s

1840s

1850s

1860s

Unknown dates

France
75 per cent of the total mileage, including:

Elsewhere in Europe

Canada

Argentina

Australia

India

Mauritius

Tunnels

Stations
Many hundreds, including:

Viaducts and other structures
Many, including:

Bridges
Again a large number, including:

Non-railway projects

References

Brassey